Reginald L. "Reggie" Joule, Jr. (born July 14, 1952) is a politician in the U.S. state of Alaska. Until recently, Joule served a three-year term as mayor of the Northwest Arctic Borough, having been elected to that position in 2012. He announced his intention to retire from public service at the end of his term.

Joule had previously served as a Democratic member of the Alaska House of Representatives, representing the 40th District from 1997 to 2012.

Legislature
Before the beginning of the 26th Legislature in January 2008, Joule, along with "bush" Democrats Bryce Edgmon and Bob Herron, began caucusing with the Republicans in the House Majority Caucus. In the House, Joule served as a member of the Finance Committee. He also chaired both the Department of Health & Social Services and Environmental Conservation Finance Subcommittee and served on the University Of Alaska Finance Subcommittee. He was a member of the Special Committee on Economic Development, Trade & Tourism and the Joint Committee on Education Funding District Cost Factor for the 27th Legislature.

Mayoralty
While serving as the Mayor of the Northwest Arctic Borough, Joule was appointed by President Obama to the US President's State, Local, Tribal Leaders Task Force on Climate Preparedness and Resilience. In his capacity as mayor, he was happy to welcome the first official and historic visit of the US President to the Alaskan Arctic to see firsthand the impacts of climate change on villages and advocate for local preparations and involvement. He chose to step down after one term and was succeeded by Clement Richards Sr. At present, Joule also serves on the Advisory Board of the UK-based 'Polar Regions' think-tank Polar Research and Policy Initiative.

Personal life
Joule has a wife, Linda, and five children: Lovisa, Reggie III, Angela, Dawn and Puyuk.  Joule graduated from Copper Valley High School (a defunct Jesuit-run boarding school in Glennallen) in 1970 and attended the University of Alaska Fairbanks from 1970–1972.

Before being elected to office, Joule was a building maintenance and construction contractor. Joule is also well known as a top competitor in the World Eskimo Indian Olympics. He is a former nalukataq (blanket toss) champion, and appeared on The Tonight Show to discuss the game. As a result of his accomplishments therein, he was inducted into the 2010 class of the Alaska Sports Hall of Fame.

Joule made two appearances on The Tonight Show Starring Johnny Carson. He appeared on August 1, 1973 and again on June 24th, 1983. Both appearances were to demonstrate the skills he used in the World Eskimo Indian Olympics.

See also
 Arctic Winter Games – Joule participated in the first AWG in 1970 and met his wife there
 List of Native American politicians
 Politics of the United States

References

External links
 Alaska State House Majority Site
 Alaska State Legislature Biography
 Project Vote Smart profile
 Follow the Money – Reggie Joule 
 2006 2004 2002 2000 1998 1996 campaign contributions
 Reggie Joule at 100 Years of Alaska's Legislature

1952 births
21st-century American politicians
Inupiat people
Living people
Mayors of places in Alaska
Democratic Party members of the Alaska House of Representatives
Native American state legislators in Alaska
Native American sportspeople
People from Nome, Alaska
People from Northwest Arctic Borough, Alaska
Sportspeople from Alaska